Guoyang County is a county in the northwest of Anhui Province, China, bordering Henan province to the north. It falls under the administration of Bozhou city.

Administrative divisions
In the present, Guoyang County has 4 subdistricts and 20 towns.
4 subdistricts

20 towns

Climate

References

Bozhou